DZNG (1044 AM) Bombo Radyo is a radio station owned and operated by Bombo Radyo Philippines through its licensee Newsounds Broadcasting Network. Its studio and transmitter are located at Bombo Radyo Broadcast Center, Diversion Rd. cor. Tabuco Dr., Naga, Camarines Sur.

References

Bombo Radyo Naga
Radio stations established in 1984
News and talk radio stations in the Philippines